Elections were held in the Bicol Region for seats in the House of Representatives of the Philippines on May 13, 2013.

The candidate with the most votes won that district's seat for the 16th Congress of the Philippines.

Summary

Albay

1st District
Incumbent Edcel Lagman (independent) is term limited; his son former Quezon City councilor Edcel Lagman, Jr. is running under  Liberal Party.

2nd District
Al Francis Bichara is the incumbent.

3rd District
Fernando Gonzalez is the incumbent.

Camarines Norte

1st District
Incumbent Renato Unico, Jr. is running for governor. Catherine Reyes is his party's nominee.

2nd District
Elmer Panotes is the incumbent.

Camarines Sur

1st District
Rolando Andaya is the incumbent.

2nd District
Dato Arroyo is the incumbent and he will face outgoing Governor Luis Raymond Villafuerte.

3rd District
Incumbent Luis Villafuerte is term limited; he will run for the governorship. His wife, Monetary Board member Nelly is his party's nominee. Late Secretary of the Interior and Local Government Jesse Robredo's widow Leni is her primary opponent.

4th District
Incumbent Arnulfo Fuentebella is term limited; his son former congressman Felix William is his party's nominee. His opponent is actor Aga Muhlach, of the Liberal Party.

In November 2012, Muhlach's candidacy was in jeopardy when a Camarines Sur Municipal Trial Court (MTC) ordered his name to be stricken off the voters' list as it ruled that he had not complied with residency requirements. Muhlach appealed the decision. A month later, the Camarines Sur Regional Trial Court (RTC) in San Jose upheld the MTC decision, allowing the removal of Muhlach from the voters' list. However, the Philippine Court of Appeals issued a restraining order in January 2013 preventing the RTC from executing its decision, thereby allowing Muhlach to run.

A week later, the Commission on Elections ruled that Muhlach is a natural-born Filipino citizen and is thus eligible to run. The commission maintained that Muhlach, who had Spanish-born father who was a naturalized Filipino at the time of his birth and a natural-born Filipino mother, didn't renounce his Philippine citizenship when the Spanish government issued him a Spanish passport, and that while Muhlach may be a dual citizen, local laws have no control on laws from other countries, including their citizenship laws. The Court of Appeals ruled on February 13 that the Muhlachs be reinstated in the voters' list, annulling the decision of the MTC and RTC, saying that the couple "have more than sufficiently complied with the residency requirement in law." Less than a month later, the Commission on Elections' Second Division dismissed a petition to dismiss Muhlach's certificate of candidacy due to his lack of residency, removing all obstacles for his candidacy.

5th District
Salvio Fortuno is the incumbent. He will be going against former congressman Felix Alfelor, Jr. and actor Rez Cortez

Catanduanes
Cesar Sarmiento is the incumbent.

Masbate

1st District
Incumbent Narciso Bravo, Jr. is term limited; his wife Maria Vida is his party's nominee.

2nd District
Incumbent Antonio Kho is running for the governorship; his wife former governor Elisa Olga Kho is his party's nominee.

3rd District
Scott Davies Lanete is the incumbent.

Sorsogon

1st District
Incumbent Salvador Escudero III died while in office. His widow Evelina is his party's nominee.

2nd District
Deogracias Ramos, Jr. is the incumbent. Independent candidate Jose Solis, congressman until 2010 when he was term limited, died on April 23, 2013. It is unknown if he, as an independent, will have a replacement candidate.

References

2013 Philippine general election
Lower house elections in the Bicol Region